White Farm is a historic farm property on Clinton Street (New Hampshire Route 13) in Concord, New Hampshire. It was listed on the National Register of Historic Places in 1981.

Description and history
The farm was established in 1846 by Nathaniel White, who became prominent in state politics, running for governor under the banner of the Prohibition Party. White also operated the first stagecoach service between Concord and Hanover, and was active in the Underground Railroad. Concord's White Memorial Universalist Church was named in his honor, and White Park was established as a gift from White's widow, Armenia.

The farm is now  in size, bounded on the south by Clinton Street and the west by the Turkey River. It includes White's 1846 Greek Revival house, which was extended with an addition late in the 19th century, a complex of 19th-century barns, and two smaller Greek Revival houses at 148 and 152 Clinton Street, which were probably farm manager residences. The State uses the complex for management of surplus goods and equipment.

See also
National Register of Historic Places listings in Merrimack County, New Hampshire

References

Farms on the National Register of Historic Places in New Hampshire
Greek Revival houses in New Hampshire
Houses completed in 1846
Buildings and structures in Concord, New Hampshire
National Register of Historic Places in Concord, New Hampshire